The Filing Open Service Interface Definition (FOSID) is an Open Knowledge Initiative specification.
OSIDs are programmatic interfaces which comprise a service-oriented architecture for designing and building reusable and interoperable software.

The Filing OSID provides platform independent storage and management of files and directories. Files and directories may be associated with metadata such as owner, mimetype, quota, and versions. Implementations may be built using any technology including file systems, databases, WebDAV, and other types of data access which require a file system oriented interface.

Software architecture